The following lists events that happened during 1938 in South Africa.

Incumbents
 Monarch: King George VI. 
 Governor-General and High Commissioner for Southern Africa: Sir Patrick Duncan 
 Prime Minister: James Barry Munnik Hertzog.
 Chief Justice: John Stephen Curlewis then James Stratford.

Events

July
 1 – The South African Press Association is established with offices in Cape Town, Johannesburg, Durban, Bloemfontein and Pretoria.

December
 16 – The cornerstone of the Voortrekker Monument is laid.
 23 – A coelacanth, a fish thought to have gone extinct prehistorically, is caught off the east coast near Chalumna River mouth.

Unknown date
 A contract is awarded to the Hollandse Anneming Maatschappij Eiendoms Beperk to construct a new Table Bay harbour in Cape Town by reclaiming ground on the Foreshore and building new and deeper docks.
 South African Jewish Maritime League is established.

Births
 17 January – Percy Qoboza, journalist, author and critic of the Nationalist government, in Sophiatown. (d. 1988)
 5 June – David Nthubu Koloane, artist, in Alexandra.
 4 July 
 Cyril Mitchley, South African cricketer, umpire and match referee.
 Ernie Pieterse, South African racing driver.
 13 August – Lindiwe Mabuza, South African politician and diplomat (d. 2021)
 12 November – Steve Tshwete, activist and politician, in Springs. (d. 2002)
 18 November – Zanele Dlamini Mbeki, former First Lady of South Africa as the wife of former President of South Africa Thabo Mbeki, founder of Women's Development Bank

Deaths

Railways

Railway lines opened
 6 November – Transvaal – Midway to Bank, .

Locomotives
 Three new locomotive types enter service on the South African Railways (SAR):
 The first of the Class 15F 4-8-2 Mountain type, at 255 the most numerous steam locomotive class on the South African Railways (SAR).
 One hundred and thirty-six Class 23 locomotives enter service, the last and the largest 4-8-2 Mountain type locomotive to be designed by the SAR.
 The first of sixteen Class GM 4-8-2+2-8-4 Double Mountain type Garratt articulated steam locomotives.

References

History of South Africa